Bogura Science & Technology University is a government financed public university of Bangladesh.

History 
Ministry Cabinet approves the bills of Bogura Science & Technology University bill, 2020.

List of vice-chancellors 

 VC ( joining date )

References

External links 
 University Grants Commission of Bangladesh
 Bangladesh Bureau of Educational Information and Statistics

Public engineering universities of Bangladesh
Public universities of Bangladesh